The Telus Open was a golf tournament that was held in the Greater Montreal area in Quebec, Canada. First held in 2000 as the QuebecTel Open, it had one of the largest purses on the Canadian Tour and the biggest on the Quebec PGA Tour. It was held for the final time in 2002.

All three editions of the Telus sponsored tournament resulted in a tie at the end of the 72-holes of regulation play, necessitating sudden-death playoffs to determine the winners.

Winners

References

Former PGA Tour Canada events
Golf tournaments in Quebec
Recurring sporting events established in 2000
Recurring sporting events disestablished in 2002
2000 establishments in Quebec
2002 disestablishments in Quebec